The 2018 Coventry City Council election took place on 3 May 2018 to elect members of Coventry City Council in England. This is on the same day as other local elections.

Current Council seats 
The table below shows a summary of the make-up of the City Council before the 3 May 2018 elections.

Number of candidates by party

Election result in 2018

Ward results 
The following tables show candidates for each Ward.

Bablake

Binley and Willenhall

Cheylesmore

Earlsdon

Foleshill

Henley

Holbrook

Longford

Lower Stoke

Radford

Sherbourne

St Michael's

Upper Stoke

Wainbody

Westwood

Whoberley

Woodlands

Wyken

References 

2018 English local elections
2018
2010s in Coventry